The Birmingham station group is a station group of three railway stations in Birmingham city centre, consisting of New Street, Moor Street, and Snow Hill.

There are two other railway stations in central Birmingham, namely Five Ways in the south west of the city centre with connections on the New Street to Redditch line, and Jewellery Quarter in the north west of the city centre with connections on the Snow Hill to Worcester line and the West Midlands Metro.

Stations

Birmingham New Street

Birmingham New Street is Birmingham's principal railway station and one of the principal stations of the UK rail network. The station is managed by Network Rail and its main entrance is located on Stephenson Street. New Street is the main gateway for most people arriving in the city and serves most of the city rail services, providing links all across the United Kingdom. Services are provided by Avanti West Coast, CrossCountry, Transport for Wales and West Midlands Trains.

Train
Avanti West Coast 
 Operates 3tph to London Euston some of which start at Wolverhapton using tilting Class 390 Pendolinos.
 Operates 1tph to Glasgow Central or Edinburgh Waverley using tilting Class 221 Super Voyagers.

CrossCountry
 1tph from Birmingham New Street to Stansted Airport via Leicester and Peterborough using Class 170 Turbostars.
 1tph from Cardiff Central to Nottingham via Derby using Class 170 Turbostars.
 1tph from Edinburgh Waverley via Leeds to Plymouth using Voyagers and HSTs.
 1tph from Manchester Piccadilly to Bournemouth using Class 220/221 Voyagers.
 1tph from Manchester Piccadilly to Bristol Temple Meads using Class 220/221 Voyagers.
 1tph from Newcastle via Doncaster to Reading using Class 220/221 Voyagers.
Some services continue towards Aberdeen, Guildford and Penzance.

West Midlands Trains
 Frequent Cross City services from Wolverhampton to Coventry/Northampton and from Lichfield to Redditch using Class 323 and Class 350 Desiro electric units.
 Local services to Hereford, Rugeley, Shrewsbury, Walsall and Worcester using Class 150 and Class 153 Sprinters, and Class 170 Turbostars.
 Regional services to London Euston via Northampton using Class 319 and Class 350 Desiros.
 2 tph from Birmingham New Street to Liverpool Lime Street via Crewe using Class 350 Desiros.

Transport for Wales
 1tph alternate from Birmingham International to Aberystwyth/Pwllheli and Holyhead using Class 158 diesel multiple units.

Tram
West Midlands Metro services from Wolverhampton St. Georges terminate here, and run at up to a 6-8 minute frequency.

Birmingham Moor Street

Birmingham Moor Street is the city's second busiest station and is currently served by local trains the lines through Shirley and Henley-in-Arden to Stratford-upon-Avon and to Leamington via Solihull, and Chiltern Clubman services to London Marylebone. Chiltern also operate a limited number of weekday services from Marylebone terminating at Moor Street formed of class 67 locomotives and hauled coaching stock. On summer Sundays it is used by steam locomotives running tourist specials between Snow Hill and Stratford upon Avon and trains between Snow Hill and Tyseley for Vintage Trains. The station is located on Moor Street Queensway opposite the Pavilions Shopping Centre and the Bull Ring. Services are provided by Chiltern Railways and West Midlands Trains.

Birmingham Snow Hill

Birmingham Snow Hill is located on Colmore Row and Livery Street and is managed by West Midlands Trains. Snow Hill provides a link between the Snow Hill Lines and the West Midlands Metro.

Long distance services 
Snow Hill is served by regular Chiltern services to and from London Marylebone. Some Chiltern services continue beyond Birmingham to Kidderminster. The Chiltern service is:

Local services 
Local services from Snow Hill, like most local services in the West Midlands, are supported by Transport for West Midlands. They are operated by West Midlands Railway. There are six West Midlands Railway trains per hour (tph) passing through Snow Hill in each direction, running as follows:

Eastbound:

 3 trains per hour to :
of which one continues to 
 3 trains per hour to 
of which one continues to 
some peak hour West Midlands Railway services continue from Dorridge to Leamington Spa

Westbound:

 6 trains per hour to :
of which four continue to :
of which two continue to 
(services beyond Worcester, to Malvern and Hereford are irregular, generally about one per hour)

Metro

Connections
Tickets marked as BIRMINGHAM STNS may be used to exit the railway network at any of the three city stations, as stated above Birmingham International is not part of the station group. All three city centre stations are less than a mile from each other, with the shortest distance being between Moor Street and New Street. Birmingham New Street is a half mile walk from Snow Hill and a quarter mile walk from Moor Street. 

A direct and regular train service is in operation between Moor Street and Snow Hill through a tunnel, and since mid-2016 the Midland Metro provides a link between Snow Hill and New Street.

Birmingham New Street and Moor Street are close to the major shopping centres in the city including Grand Central (formerly known as The Pallasades) and the Bullring. All three stations have a good interchange with bus services mostly operated by National Express West Midlands.

See also 
 Transport in Birmingham
 Network West Midlands
 UK Railway Station Groups

References

Bibliography
 https://web.archive.org/web/20111002160621/http://centro.journalistpresslounge.com/centro/news/index.cfm/fuseaction/details/id/BE043D85-13D3-97AA-2D4BEE37003FF84F/cnt/1/ref/main/type/News%20releases/ses/1.cfm

External links
Station information for Birmingham New Street from Network Rail
Station information for Birmingham Moor Street from Chiltern Railways
Station information for Birmingham Snow Hill from West Midlands Railway
 Network Rail website
 West Midlands Railway official website
 London Northwestern Railway official website
 Chiltern Railways official home page
 CrossCountry official website
 Transport for Wales official website
Virgin Trains web site
National Express West Midlands website
http://www.nationalexpress.com/metro - midland metro homepage

 
Transport in the West Midlands (county)